The Blackwell Companion to Philosophy is a  reference work in philosophy, edited by Nicholas Bunnin and E. P. Tsui-James, and published by Blackwell Publishers in 1996.

References

eds. Nicholas Bunnin and E. P. Tsui-James
The Blackwell Companion to Philosophy
(Cambridge, MA: Blackwell Publishers Ltd, 1996)
 (alk paper)
 (pbk: alk paper)

1996 non-fiction books
Dictionaries of philosophy